Hangchow University, also spelled as Zhijiang University and formerly known as Hangchow Christian College, Hangchow College, and Hangchow Presbyterian College, is a defunct Protestant missionary university in China, which is one of the predecessors of Zhejiang University. Founded as Ningpo Boy’s Boarding School by Divie Bethune McCartee and colleagues of Northern Presbyterian Church in Ningbo in 1845, the university was one of the oldest missionary schools in China before it was shut down in 1952. The university was merged into Zhejiang University and other universities in China. Its campus was taken over by Zhejiang University as its Zhijiang Campus in 1961, which became a major nationally protected historic site in 2006.

History

As a middle school 

In 1845, the American missionary Divie Bethune McCartee founded Ningpo Boys' Boarding School, also known as Ningpo Boys' Academy, in Ningpo, one of the first treaty ports in China. Aiming to influence local Chinese with Christianity and making them assist the mission, the school provided training in religion, geography, history, mathematics, science, language, and arts and crafts and recruited up to 30 students a year. In 1846, a girls' boarding school was founded by Caroline Hubble Cole, which functioned as a place for missionary wives to serve. In 1847, when Mary Ann Aldersey left Ningpo, her girls' boarding school was merged into that of the church at her request. The Ningpo Girls' Boarding School founded by Aldersey was the first girls' high school in China. With the land lease in Ningpo due in 1867, the boys' school moved to Hangchow, the capital of Chekiang, and was renamed as Hangchow Presbyterian Boys' School.

As a university 
1897, the school opened courses for higher education, and became a college, named Hangchow Presbyterian College. In 1911, the college moved to Qinwang Hill outside the city of Hangchow, now known as Zhijiang Campus today. In 1914, it was renamed to Hangchow Christian College. In Chinese, it was called Zhijiang University. Zhijiang is an alternative name to Chekiang (浙江) in Chinese, which means the Hangchow River and also the province of Chekiang. According to Junius Herbert Judson, who founded the college, the college was named so in Chinese as it provided a bird's-eye view of the Hangchow River from its location.

During the Northern Expedition, the college ceased operating for a while. With the foundation of the new Nationalist government after the expedition, the college resumed operations in 1931, and was registered as the Private Hangchow College of Sciences and Humanities in Chinese, because the college only had two branches, the sciences branch and the humanities branch. In English, it was called Hangchow Christian College and later, Hangchow College.

Wartime relocation 
As the Second Sino-Japanese War broke out, the college moved from Hangchow to Tengchi in November 1937. However, as Kwangteh and neighbouring areas fell to the Japanese, the autumn term was forced to end in December, as defeated Chinese soldiers crowded into the town of Tengchi. The college resumed operation in the spring term of 1938 in cooperation with the University of Shanghai, St. John's University, and other refugee Christian colleges in Shanghai as the Associated Christian Colleges. During the time, the college developed into a university with an arts college, a College of Business, and an Engineering College.  

With the outbreak of the Pacific War, the Shanghai International Settlement fell to the Japanese in December 1941. The university moved to Shaowu, Fukien, on the campus of Fukien Christian University in autumn 1942. The university opened its Engineering College in Kweiyang in autumn 1943 on the wartime campus of the Great China University. The Shaowu campus was closed in June 1944 due to further Japanese invasion nearby, with its students transferred to Amoy University in Tingchow. Due to further Japanese invasion near Kweiyang in December 1944, the engineering college was again dismissed, until it reopened in Chungking as part of an associated university with Soochow University School of Law and University of Shanghai Business School. With the Japanese surrender in August 1945, the associated university continued its work until the end of spring term in 1946.  

Meanwhile, as not all students retreated to the inland, the university continued to offer courses in Shanghai. In autumn 1943, a number of Hangchow faculty who remained in Shanghai formed East China University in cooperation with Soochow University faculty in Shanghai, which was further joined by St. John's University and was renamed as East China Union University in spring 1945.

Post-war period 
With the Japanese surrender in August 1945, East China Union University was closed, leading to an reopening of Hangchow University in Shanghai. The university raised funds and restored the war-torn Zakow campus, which allowed it to reopen at this campus in spring 1946. On Christmas of 1946, the university celebrated its 100th anniversary in Hangchow. In July 1948, the university status became recognised by the government. As a result, the university recovered its Chinese name, Zhijiang University, used from 1911 to 1931. However, with continuous Kuomintang defeats in the civil war with the Communists, the American faculty left the university by the end of 1948.   

On 3 May 1949, the People's Liberation Army defeated Kuomintang troops on the north bank of the Qiantang River, thus entering the campus of Hangchow University, which was welcomed by many of the students and faculty. On the following day, Hangchow students came to the campus of Zhejiang University to celebrate the anniversary of the May Fourth Movement and the Communist control of the city. President Baen Lee resigned from his position and left the university on the same day. Historian Lin Handa was invited by the students to serve as the new president, which was declined. In July, Li Zhaohuan was elected as the president by the university committee.   

During the nationwide university and college reorganisation in 1952, the university was closed in January, with its mechanical and civil engineering departments merged into Zhejiang University. Its college of arts and sciences merged with the School of Humanities, Zhejiang University, to form Zhejiang Teachers College. The School of Finance and Economics of Hangchow University gained independence as the Zhejiang College of Finance and Economics, which was later merged into Shanghai College of Finance and Economics in August.

Campuses

Before 1906 
Founded in Ningbo as a middle school, the campus of Ningpo Boy's Boarding School was located at North Bank, Ningbo, for which the accommodation was near the Oil Mill Bridge. In 1867, the school, renamed as Hangchow Presbyterian Boys' School, later known as Hangchow Presbyterian College in 1897, moved to the Hangchow campus at Leather Market Street (皮市巷) and later was relocated at Pagoda Street (大塔儿巷) next to Pishi Lane in the city centre of Hangchow.

Zakow, Hangchow 

Since 1906, a new campus was proposed by the board of directors of Hangchow Presbyterian College. Located at Zakow, Chekiang, the new campus was to the west of Zakow station (闸口火车站), which was the western terminal of trains from Shanghai before the Chientang River Bridge was built. From 1906 to 1911, the college acquired land in the hill of Chin Wang Shan (秦望山) near Zakow (闸口) to build its new campus. The campus was a special combination of both the Western and Chinese architectural styles, with new buildings continued to be built while the university remained on the campus. The campus is now used by Zhejiang University and has become a major nationally protected historic site since 2006.

Wartime relocation 
During the Second Sino-Japanese War, the university left the campus and fled to Tengchi, Shanghai, Shaowu, Kweiyang, and Chungking, during which the college developed into a university with multiple colleges. When the university returned to the Zakow campus in 1946, it renovated the campus and continued on the campus until it was closed down in 1952.

Notable people

Alumni 
 Chen Congzhou (born 1918) architect.
 Jin Zhonghua, politician.
 Joseph T. Ling (Lin Zuodi), member of the US National Academy of Engineering.
 Mei Shaowu, translator.
 Qi Jun (1917 - 2006), writer.
 Yang Sixin (born 1930) architect.
 Zhang Wencai, biologist.
 Zhu Shenghao, translator.

Presidents 
 Rev, Junius Herbert Judson, President of Hangchow Presbyterian College
 Elmer L. Mattox, President of Hangchow Christian College, 1914 to 1916.
 Warren Horton Stuart, President of Hangchow Christian College, 1916 to 1922.
 Robert Ferris Fitch, President of Hangchow Christian College, 1922 to 1931.
 Baen E. Lee, President of Hangchow University, 1931 to 1949, the first Chinese president.
Li Zhaohuan, President of Hangchow University 1949 to 1952.

Legacy 

The university was merged into Zhejiang University in 1952. The campus of the university became the Zhijiang Campus of Zhejiang University in 1958. The former site of Hangchow University was made a Major Historical and Cultural Site Protected at the National Level in 2006.

The board of the former Hangchow University, along with other Christian universities in China, founded Chung Chi College in Hong Kong in 1951 as a continuation of the tradition of Chinese Christian universities. The college later became part of the Chinese University of Hong Kong in 1963. The seals of 13 former Chinese Christian universities were hung above the two sides of the altar of the Chung Chi College Chaplaincy, which is the only place to see them, including the seal of Hangchow University, in China.

See also 

 Hangzhou University and Zhejiang University
 List of Christian colleges in China
 United Board for Christian Higher Education in Asia

References

Further reading

External links 

 Hangchow Christian College, Divinity Library, Yale University Library
 McCartee Family Papers, Presbyterian Historical Society
 Elmer L. Mattox papers, 1905-1954., Division of Rare and Manuscript Collections, Cornell University Library

 Alumni Register of Hangchow University, Zhejiang Archives (in Chinese only)

Universities and colleges in Zhejiang
Educational institutions established in 1845
Education in Hangzhou
History of Zhejiang University
Major National Historical and Cultural Sites in Zhejiang
Defunct universities and colleges in China
Education in Ningbo
Protestant missionaries in China
Christian colleges in China